The Arizona Complex League Dodgers are a Rookie-level affiliate of the Los Angeles Dodgers, competing in the Arizona Complex League of Minor League Baseball. The team plays its home games at Camelback Ranch in Phoenix, Arizona. The team is composed mainly of players who are in their first year of professional baseball either as draftees or non-drafted free agents.

History
The Los Angeles Dodgers previously fielded a Rookie-level team in the Gulf Coast League (GCL) from 1983 to 1992 and then from 2001 to 2008, known as the Gulf Coast League Dodgers. The team played its home games in Vero Beach, Florida, on Field One of Historic Dodgertown. Dodgertown includes Holman Stadium, which was the spring training home to the major-league Dodgers. The GCL Dodgers originally played from 1983 to 1992, then were absent from the GCL until being reactivated in 2001.

In 2009, the Dodgers announced that the team would relocate to Arizona and compete in the Arizona League (AZL). The team plays its home games at Camelback Ranch, the spring training facility of the major-league Dodgers. In 2019, the Dodgers fielded two squads in the Arizona League, differentiated with suffixes "Lasorda" and "Mota". Prior to the 2021 season, the Arizona League was renamed as the Arizona Complex League (ACL).

Season by season

Current roster

References

External links
 Official website

Baseball teams established in 2009
Arizona Complex League teams
Professional baseball teams in Arizona
Los Angeles Dodgers minor league affiliates
2009 establishments in Arizona
Sports in Phoenix, Arizona